The 2001 Australian Individual Speedway Championship was held at the Riverview Speedway in Murray Bridge, South Australia on 3 February.

Former World #3 Todd Wiltshire won his second Australian Championship after defeating defending champion Leigh Adams in a runoff. Mick Poole from New South Wales finished third after defeating Perth's Steve Johnston in a runoff, while Shane Parker defeated fellow Adelaide riders Brett Woodifield and Nigel Sadler in a runoff to claim the final spot in the Overseas Final.

2001 Australian Solo Championship
 3 February 2001
  Murray Bridge - Riverview Speedway
 Referee: 
 Qualification: The top five riders go through to the Overseas Final in Poole, England.

References

See also
 Australia national speedway team
 Sport in Australia

Speedway in Australia
Australia
Individual Speedway Championship
February 2001 sports events in Australia